Picollator is an Internet search engine that performs searches for web sites and multimedia by visual query (image) or text, or a combination of visual query and text. Picollator recognizes objects in the image, obtains their relevance to the text and vice versa, and searches in accordance with all information provided.

Description 

At present, Picollator identifies human faces in the images and creates a database of people's faces. This allows the user to search for other images of the submitted person, lookalikes and/or similar images in images found on websites. Picollator can be used in any language.

History 

2006  Recogmission LLC developed a desktop application for photo collections management. The system automatically classifies, manages and retrieves photographs stored locally or in corporate databases.

2007  Recogmission started Picollator multimedia search engine project, now in Beta stage.

2008  Picollator.mobi  is launched—a new universal search engine for mobile phones.

2009  Recogmission opens the web based content filter service piFilter.com , which inherited some pattern recognition technologies from Picollator.

Features 

Most image search engines match user textual query and picture tags. Picollator is based on a different approach. Patterns and objects found in the image are stored in its database, therefor it is able to understand the contents of the image and compare it to other images to find similarities.

To search for multimedia information, the user may submit

Sample image to find images with relevant people
Image to find web resources
Text to find images
Text to find web resources
Text and Image to find images and/or web resources.

Trivia 

Picollator is a noun, while the corresponding verb 'to picollate' has been first invented by Recogmission team. 'Picollate' consists of two words sampled: 'PICture' and 'COLLATE'. Recogmission used the word 'picollate' in the meaning of the process of picture searching and managing.

Picollator generally works with digital photos and texts and offers the hybrid search possibility. Yet, the system is able to process artworks and even painted portraits.

Picollator image index contains black-and-white as well as coloured images.

Company 

:ru:Recogmission LLC has developed a novel indexing engine for multimedia information search based on the visual query.

Recogmission develops solutions for multimedia information (image, text and video) indexing and searching on the web and in corporate environments.

References 
Picollator Loves My Girlish Smile, Inside the Marketers Studio - David Berkowitz's Marketing Blog . March 20, 2008
Picollator.com - An Image Based Search Engine, Killerstartups.com
Picollator - Image search engine, Phil Bradley's weblog. March 31, 2008
Image-Based Queries, Techpin. March 16, 2008
Picollator: Buscador de rostros, Neoteo 
Picollator Online Search, buscador de caras dentro de las imágenes online, Genbeta . March 26, 2008
 Picollator:基于脸部特征的图片搜索引擎, 天涯海阁 
Picollator - Gesichter suchen mit Bildvorlagen, @-web Suchmaschinen Weblog. July 21, 2008
Picollator Launches New Web Search System, TMCnet.com . July 15, 2008
Picollator sucht Menschen mithilfe von Gesichtserkennung, Internet World Business . July 22, 2008
Sketch based query for image retrieval, Kmvirtual . May 30, 2008
 Picollator - текстовый или визуальный поиск?, Стартаперы.ru
Picollator найдет ваших селебрити-клонов, Вебпланета. March 3, 2008
Picollator ищет похожих людей, Новости Медиа Атлас . March 3, 2008
Picollator - Οπτική αναζήτηση… περίπου :), Internetakias.gr . April 7, 2008
Доступны мультимедийные запросы в новой поисковой системе Picollator, ITua.info. March 14, 2008
Как найти человека по рисунку лица?, Newsland
Всевидящее око онлайна, Игромания. July, 2008
Microsoft поднимет долю программ в ВВП, OSP.ru July 1, 2008
Поисковик - Picollator, Веб2н0льные Заметки. April 27, 2008
Система поиска по мультимедийным запросам, Мониторинг Интернета. April 7, 2008 
В Рунете запущена система мультимедийного поиска Picollator.ru, Elvisti.com. April 13, 2008
Мультимедийный поиск становится интеллектуальным, Rocit.ru . July 2, 2008
В Рунете появилась система поиска похожих картинок, Eplus.com.ua . March 11, 2008
Ресурсы в сети можно искать с помощью изображений, Commcenter.ru. March 29, 2008

Facial recognition software
Data mining and machine learning software
Internet search engines